Joanna Bruzdowicz (17 May 1943 – 3 November 2021) was a Polish composer.

Life
Born in Warsaw, Bruzdowicz studied at the Warsaw Music High School, at the State Higher School of Music (composition with Kazimierz Sikorski and piano with Irena Protasiewicz and Wanda Osakiewicz); she earned her M.A. in 1966. She continued her studies in Paris on a scholarship from the French government and became a student of Nadia Boulanger, Olivier Messiaen and Pierre Schaeffer (1968–70). She joined the electroacoustic Groupe de Recherches Musicales and wrote her doctoral thesis "Mathematics and Logic in Contemporary Music" at the Sorbonne.

After completing her studies in France, she settled in Belgium with her husband, Horst-Jürgen Tittel, former top advisor to the president of the European Commission. Together, they created the 36-episode German TV series Stahlkammer Zürich for which Bruzdowicz wrote over 15 hours of music. They lived in the South of France. They have three sons: Mark, Jan and Jörg Tittel.

Artistic range
As a composer she devoted her attention to opera, symphonic and chamber music, works for children, and music for film and television. She wrote four concerti and numerous chamber pieces, as well as over 25 hours of film music. Her compositions were featured on 12 CDs and over 20 LPs; she was featured in TV programs produced in Belgium, France, Germany and Poland.

Her output included several operas which brought to the stage some of the greatest works of European literature (e.g. The Penal Colony, after Franz Kafka, 1972; The Women of Troy after Euripides, 1973; and The Gates of Paradise, after Jerzy Andrzejewski, 1987).

Bruzdowicz had a long-standing creative relationship with French film director Agnès Varda, for whom she composed soundtracks for movies from Sans Toit Ni Loi (engl. Vagabond, Golden Lion in Venice, 1985) to Les Glaneurs et la Glaneuse (engl. The Gleaners and I), her multiple award-winning documentary.

More recently, her music could be heard in her second collaboration with director Yves Angelo, Les Ames Grises (engl. The Grey Souls), the last movie starring French comedian Jacques Villeret.

Film score
 1997: An Air So Pure

Sources

Polish Music Center at USC

References

External links
Interview with Joanna Bruzdowicz, 7 May 1991
 Joanna Bruzdowicz's biography on Cdmc website
 
 

1943 births
2021 deaths
20th-century classical composers
21st-century classical composers
Women classical composers
Women film score composers
Women opera composers
Musicians from Warsaw
Polish classical composers
Polish film score composers
Polish opera composers
20th-century women composers
21st-century women composers
Polish women composers